The 2013 Sultan Azlan Shah Cup was the 22nd edition of the Sultan Azlan Shah Cup. It was held from 9–17 March 2013 in Ipoh, Perak, Malaysia. Australia was the winner after defeating Malaysia in the final.

Participating nations
Six countries participated in this year's tournament:

Results
All times are Malaysia Standard Time (UTC+08:00)

Pool

Classification

Fifth and sixth

Third and fourth place

Final

Awards
Five awards were awarded during the tournament, they are:
Fairplay: 
Best Player:  Razie Rahim
Man of Match of Final:  Trent Mitton
Best Goalkeeper:  Kumar Subramaniam
Top Scorer:  Faizal Saari,  Rupinder Pal Singh (6 goals)

References

External links
Official website

2013
2013 in field hockey
2013 in Malaysian sport
2013 in Australian field hockey
2013 in New Zealand sport
2013 in Pakistani sport 
2013 in South Korean sport
2013 in Indian sport
March 2013 sports events in Asia